Artotina is a mountain village in the municipal unit of Vardousia, northwestern Phocis, Greece. It is situated on the western slope of the Vardousia mountains, near the source of the river Evinos, at about 1200 m elevation. Artotina is located 12 km north of Pentagioi and 36 km northwest of Amfissa.

Population

History

It is claimed that Athanasios Diakos, a Greek national hero of the Greek War of Independence, was born in Artotina, but this is also claimed by the village Athanasios Diakos (formerly Ano Mousounitsa). Other revolutionaries from Artotina were Dimos Skaltsas, Ioannis Roukis, Andritsos Siafakas, Gerantonos and Loukas Kaliakoudas.

See also
List of settlements in Phocis

References

External links
 Artotina GTP Travel Pages

Populated places in Phocis